The superb pitta (Pitta superba) is a large pitta that is endemic to Manus Island which lies to the north of Papua New Guinea.

Description
It has black plumage with turquoise blue wings, a scarlet belly and green-tipped secondaries. The sexes are very similar but the female is a slightly smaller and duller than the male. As with other pittas, it is a secretive and rarely seen terrestrial bird. The diet consists mainly of snails.

Distribution and habitat
The superb pitta is distributed and endemic to primary and secondary forests of Manus Island of Papua New Guinea. Due to ongoing habitat loss, limited range and small population size, it is evaluated as endangered on the IUCN Red List of Threatened Species.

Gallery

References

External links 
 BirdLife Species Factsheet

Pitta (genus)
Birds of Papua New Guinea
Birds described in 1914